Lia Anna Di Leo (22 July 1923 – 15 December 2006) was an Italian actress and model. She entered the 1951 Miss Italy contest and then began acting in films, generally playing glamorous supporting roles. 

Di Leo's parents died while she was very young, and as a result she raised her two younger twin brothers, Marion and Tony. After marrying in 1957 she retired from the screen and moved to the United States, where she worked as a sculptor. She died in Palm Springs, California on 15 December 2006, at the age of 83.

Selected filmography
 Lorenzaccio (1951)
 Quo Vadis (1951)
 The Tired Outlaw (1952)
 The Black Mask (1952)
 The Piano Tuner Has Arrived (1952)
 The Earrings of Madame de… (1953)
 Empty Eyes (1953)
 The Return of Don Camillo (1953)
 Cose da pazzi (1954)
 Mizar (Sabotaggio in mare) (1954)
 Tower of Lust (1955)
 Le avventure di Giacomo Casanova (1955)
 Wives and Obscurities (1956)

References

Bibliography 
 Claudio G. Fava. Alberto Sordi. Gremese Editore, 2003.

External links 
 

1923 births
2006 deaths
Italian film actresses
People from Taranto